Gabriel Estêvão Monjane (1944–1990) is one of only twenty individuals in medical history to have reached  or more in height.

Born in Manjacaze, Gaza Province, Mozambique, Monjane's abnormal growth, attributed to an overactive pituitary gland, started soon after birth. By the time he was 17, Monjane stood  He joined a Portuguese circus.

During his lifetime, especially late into his life, Monjane suffered leg problems. The Guinness Book of World Records stated that he was the tallest living man in their 1988 edition.  Monjane died in January 1990 after a fall at his home, after which Suleiman Ali Nashnush, another African, was named the tallest living man.

See also
 List of tallest people

References

External links
 

1944 births
1990 deaths
People from Gaza Province
People with gigantism
20th-century circus performers
Accidental deaths from falls
Accidental deaths in Mozambique